Jiang Yefei (born 22 February 1967) is a Chinese fencer. He competed in the team sabre event at the 1992 Summer Olympics.

References

External links
 

1967 births
Living people
Chinese male sabre fencers
Olympic fencers of China
Fencers at the 1992 Summer Olympics
Asian Games medalists in fencing
Fencers at the 1990 Asian Games
Asian Games gold medalists for China
Medalists at the 1990 Asian Games
20th-century Chinese people